Aspall Cyder Ltd is a manufacturer of cider and other apple derived products. Its cidery is located at Aspall Hall in the village of Aspall, Suffolk, England. It was bought by Molson Coors in 2018.

History
The business was originally established in the early-18th century. Production was based on apple trees initially introduced for the use of the Chevalliers of Aspall Hall, the owners of the estate, from their native Jersey. In 1946 the company was a founding member of the Soil Association. 

In addition to cider, Aspall also produce an unfermented apple juice, organic apple cider vinegar and apple-based balsamic vinegar. The company also imports and markets: Spanish Red wine vinegar and White Wine Vinegar, and an Italian Organic Balsamic Vinegar.

On 7 January 2018, it was announced that the Aspall company had been sold to Molson Coors Brewing Company, ending 290 years of independently owned manufacturing. The deal is understood to give the company an enterprise value of £40m, although this figure includes debt (roughly £19m in 2016 accounts) and promise of investment from Molson.

In a January 2019 BBC interview, Aspall manager Dale Scott revealed a £10 million investment plan to improve the site's facilities. Improvements would include a new processing building, weighbridge for vehicles and extra storage tanks.

Range

Aspall Cyder 
Aspall Draught Suffolk Cyder (5.5% ABV) – available on draught or bottled
Aspall Organic Suffolk Cyder (6.8% ABV) – bottled only
Aspall Premier Cru Suffolk Cyder (6.8% ABV) – bottled only
Aspall Vintage Imperial Cyder (8.2% ABV) – bottled only
Aspall Hot Spiced Cyder (4.7% ABV) – 5 litre box only
Aspall Mulled Suffolk Cyder (3.8%) – 20 litre box only
Aspall Harry Sparrow Cyder (4.6% ABV) – bottled only
Aspall 1728 (11.0% ABV) – bottled only (limited edition sparkling cider)

Pip & Wild Cyder 

 Strawberry & Rose (4.0% ABV) – bottled only
 Blackberry & Nettle (4.0% ABV) – bottled only

Cyder Vinegar 

 Raw Apple Cyder Vinegar with Honey
 Raw Organic Apple Cyder Vinegar
 Organic White Wine Vinegar
 Organic Red Wine Vinegar
 Organic Balsamic Vinegar
 Apple Balsamic Vinegar
 Sauvignon Blanc White Wine Vinegar
 Classic White Wine Vinegar
 Classic Cyder Vinegar
 Classic Red Wine Vinegar

References

External links
 Aspall Cyder

Brands of cider
1728 establishments in England
Aspall Cider
English ciders
Food and drink companies established in 1728
Molson Coors Beverage Company
Drink companies of England
British companies established in 1728